The following is a list of the largest optical telescopes in the 20th century, paying special attention to the diameter of the mirror or lens of the telescope's objective, or aperture. Aperture rank currently goes approximately by the usable physical aperture size and not by aperture synthesis, although interferometers attained some of the highest angular resolutions at visible and infrared wavelengths compared to traditional telescopes. Diverging methods of construction and use for reflecting telescopes in that area make comparing synthesized aperture irregular.

For instance, Keck I or II alone has less angular resolution than the Keck Interferometer (Keck I & II together), however, the Keck Interferometer is used for a much narrower range of type of observations. Ultimately, a valid comparison between two telescopes must take into consideration more specifications, when a general measurement becomes obtuse.

Aperture of the primary mirror alone can be poor measure of a reflective telescope's significance; for example, the Hubble Space Telescope has only a  primary mirror. In addition, many large or significant telescopes are not optical and/or reflecting. However, many famous optical telescopes have had large apertures on their primary mirror with corresponding good angular resolution.

Including optical observatories, including UV, visible and some optical infrared telescopes, near infrared. Covers from about 1901 to 2001, with some flexibility to accommodate ambiguity in classification, for example some 2002 telescope, if it was nearly operation in 2001. 19th century and earlier telescopes that ceased operation are not included, but the list is not complete.

Table of optical telescopes
Multiple mirror telescopes are ranked by their equivalent optical area, not peak interferometric aperture unless it is not relevant for the design.  See also List of astronomical interferometers at visible and infrared wavelengths.

See also  List of largest optical refracting telescopes, as this list does yet not include such large refractors as the Yerkes Observatory.

This table does not include all the 20th largest mirrors manufactured; the Steward Observatory Mirror Lab produced the 6.5-metre f/1.25 collimator used in the Large Optical Test and Integration Site of Lockheed Martin, used for vacuum optical testing of other telescopes.

Segmented are also known as Mosaic mirrors. Single mirrors, also called monolithic and can be sub-categorized in types, such as solid or honeycomb.

Selected telescopes with apertures of 90 cm (35.4 in.) and smaller 
Some famous 20th century regionally famous telescopes, space telescopes, or otherwise significant. (100 cm = 1 meter)
 

At the end of the 20th century preliminary designs for Extremely large telescope of the 21st century were being worked on, as well as many smaller telescopes such as the Large Binocular Telescope

Under Construction
Examples of telescopes that were started in the 20th century, but may only have achieved a preliminary level of construction by the turn of the century.

Refractors

See also
 List of largest optical telescopes in the 19th century
 List of largest optical telescopes in the 18th century
 Lists of telescopes
 List of largest optical reflecting telescopes
 List of optical telescopes
 List of large optical telescopes
 List of largest optical telescopes historically
 List of astronomical interferometers at visible and infrared wavelengths

References
 
 google units calculator

Further reading
List of large reflecting telescopes
The World's Largest Optical Telescopes
"The Astronomical Scrapbook", Joseph Ashbrook, Sky Publishing Corporation 1984, 
"Giant Telescopes of the World", Sky and Telescope, August 2000.
"The History of the Telescope", Henry C. King. (1955)
"The Historical Growth of Telescope Aperture", René Racine, Publications of the Astronomical Society of the Pacific, 116
 JRASC (1929) vol 23, p. 351
 Sky & Telescope (April 1981) p. 303
 Sky & Telescope (July 1993) vol 86, p. 27–32
 James H. Burge, 1993 Dissertation at UA, "Advanced Techniques for Measuring Primary Mirrors for Astronomical Telescopes"

External links
 List of large reflecting telescopes
 The World's Largest Optical Telescopes
 Largest optical telescopes of the world
 Selected largest telescopes
 Stellafane telescope links

Lists of telescopes
20th century in science
20th century-related lists
Telescopes